Chicoreus is a genus of medium- to large-sized predatory sea snails. These are carnivorous marine gastropod molluscs in the family Muricidae, the murexes or rock snails.

Species
Over 100 species are within the genus, with several subgenera,  including:

Chicoreus aculeatus (Lamarck, 1822)
 Chicoreus akritos Radwin & D'Attilio, 1976
Chicoreus allaryi Houart, Quiquandon & Briano, 2004
 Chicoreus androyensis Damarco & Briano, 2020
 Chicoreus anosyensis Bozzetti, 2013
 Chicoreus aquilus Houart, Moe & C. Chen, 2017
 Chicoreus arbaguil Houart, 2015
Chicoreus asianus Kuroda, 1942
Chicoreus austramosus Vokes, 1978
Chicoreus axicornis (Lamarck, 1822)
Chicoreus banksii (Sowerby II, 1841)
Chicoreus boucheti Houart, 1983
Chicoreus bourguignati (Poirier, 1883)
Chicoreus brevifrons (Lamarck, 1822)
 Chicoreus brianbaileyi (Mühlhäusser, 1984)
Chicoreus brunneus (Link, 1807)
Chicoreus bullisi Vokes, 1974
Chicoreus bundharmai Houart, 1992
 Chicoreus capucinus Lamarck, 1822
Chicoreus cervicornis (Lamarck, 1822)
Chicoreus cloveri (Houart, 1985)
Chicoreus cnissodus (Euthyme, 1889)
 Chicoreus cornucervi (Röding, 1798)
Chicoreus corrugatus Sowerby II, 1841
Chicoreus cosmani Abbott & Finlay, 1979
Chicoreus crosnieri Houart, 1985
Chicoreus damicornis (Hedley, 1903)
 Chicoreus denudatus (Perry, 1811)
 Chicoreus dharmai Houart, 2015
 Chicoreus dodongi Houart, 1995
 Chicoreus dovi Houart, 1984
 Chicoreus dunni Petuch, 1987
 Chicoreus duyenae Thach, 2016
 Chicoreus elisae Bozzetti, 1991
 Chicoreus exuberans Cossignani, 2004
 Chicoreus felicitatis Bozzetti, 2011
 Chicoreus florifer (Reeve, 1846)
 Chicoreus fosterorum Houart, 1989
 Chicoreus franchii Cossignani, 2005
 Chicoreus franzettiae Houart, 2019
 Chicoreus giadae Cossignani, 2016
 Chicoreus groschi Vokes, 1978
 Chicoreus guillei Houart, 1985
 Chicoreus ingridmariae Houart, 2010
 Chicoreus insularum (Pilsbry, 1921)
 Chicoreus janae Houart, 2013
 Chicoreus jessicae Houart, 2008
 Chicoreus kahlbrocki Houart & Lorenz, 2020
 Chicoreus kaitomoei Houart, Moe & C. Chen, 2017
 Chicoreus kantori Houart & Héros, 2013 
 Chicoreus laqueatus (Sowerby II, 1841)
 † Chicoreus lawsi (P. A. Maxwell, 1971) 
 Chicoreus leali Thach, 2016
 Chicoreus litos Vokes, 1978
 Chicoreus loebbeckei (Kobelt, 1879)
 Chicoreus longicornis (Dunker, 1864)
 Chicoreus lorenzi Houart, 2009 
 Chicoreus maurus (Broderip, 1833)
 Chicoreus mergus Vokes, 1974
 Chicoreus microphyllus (Lamarck, 1816)
 Chicoreus miyokoae (Kosuge, 1979) 
 Chicoreus mocki Beals, 1997
 Chicoreus monicae Bozzetti, 2001
 Chicoreus nobilis Shikama, 1977
 Chicoreus orchidiflorus Shikama, 1973
 Chicoreus paini Houart, 1983
 Chicoreus palmarosae (Lamarck, 1822)
 Chicoreus paucifrondosus Houart, 1988
 Chicoreus peledi Vokes, 1978
 Chicoreus pisori Houart, 2007
 Chicoreus rachelcarsonae Petuch, 1987
 Chicoreus ramosus (Linnaeus, 1758)
 Chicoreus roberti Bozzetti, 2015
 Chicoreus rossiteri (Crosse, 1872)
 Chicoreus rubescens (Broderip, 1833)
 Chicoreus ryosukei Shikama, 1978
 Chicoreus ryukyuensis Shikama, 1978
 Chicoreus saulii (Sowerby II, 1841)
 Chicoreus setionoi Houart, 2001
 Chicoreus solangeae Bozzetti, 2014
 Chicoreus spectrum (Reeve, 1846)
 Chicoreus strigatus (Reeve, 1849)
 Chicoreus subpalmatus Houart, 1988
 Chicoreus territus (Reeve, 1845)
 Chicoreus teva Houart & Lorenz, 2016
 Chicoreus thomasi (Crosse, 1872)
 Chicoreus torrefactus (Sowerby II, 1841)
 Chicoreus trivialis (A. Adams, 1854)
 Chicoreus varius (G.B. Sowerby II, 1834)
 Chicoreus virgineus (Röding, 1798)
 †Chicoreus xestos (E. Vokes, 1974)
 Chicoreus zululandensis Houart, 1989

Synonymized species  
Chicoreus adustus Lamarck, 1822 : synonym of Chicoreus (Triplex) brunneus (Link, 1807)
Chicoreus akritos Radwin & D'Attilio, 1976 : synonym of Chicoreus (Triplex) microphyllus (Lamarck, 1816)
Chicoreus clausii (Dunker, 1879) : synonym of Hexaplex (Trunculariopsis) varius clausii (Dunker, 1879)
Chicoreus cloveri Houart, 1985: represented as Chicoreus (Triplex) cloveri Houart, 1985 
Chicoreus gubbi (Reeve, 1849) : synonym of Chicocenebra gubbi (Reeve, 1849)
Chicoreus guionneti Merle, Garrigues & Pointier, 2002 : synonym of Siratus guionneti (Merle, Garrigues & Pointier, 2001)
Chicoreus inflatus (Lamarck, 1822) : synonym of Chicoreus (Chicoreus) ramosus
Chicoreus perelegans Vokes, 1965 : synonym of Siratus perelegans (Vokes, 1965)
Chicoreus subtilis Houart, 1977 : synonym of Chicoreus (Chicopinnatus) orchidiflorus (Shikama, 1973)
Chicoreus superbus (Sowerby, 1889) : synonym of Chicomurex superbus (Sowerby, 1889)

Subgenus Chicoreus (Phyllonotus) Swainson, 1833
In 2011, Phyllonotus was raised to the status of genus from its former state as subgenus of Chicoreus.
Chicoreus erythrostomus (Swainson, 1831): synonym of Hexaplex erythrostomus (Swainson, 1831)
Chicoreus regius (Swainson, 1821): synLamarckonym of Hexaplex regius (Swainson, 1821)

References

External links 

 Chicoreus ramosus, at zipcodezoo (archived from the original)
 Another taxonomy at 

 
Muricinae